The 1917 Furman Baptists football team represented Furman University during the 1917 Southern Intercollegiate Athletic Association football season. Led by third-year head coach Billy Laval, Furman compiled an overall record of 3–5 with a mark of 1–3 in SIAA play.

Schedule

References

Furman
Furman Paladins football seasons
Furman Baptists football